Redwater River is a river located in Butte County, South Dakota, a tributary of the Belle Fourche River. It is near Belle Fourche, South Dakota.

References

Rivers of Butte County, South Dakota